Juggling terminology, juggling (especially toss juggling) terms:

References

External links
"Glossary", Juggling.org.

Juggling
juggling
Wikipedia glossaries using description lists